Mateusz Polaczyk (born 22 January 1988) is a Polish slalom canoeist who has competed at the international level since 2004.

He won six medals at the ICF Canoe Slalom World Championships with four silvers (K1: 2011, 2015; K1 team: 2013, 2018) and two bronzes (K1: 2013, K1 team: 2006). He also won three golds, two silvers and three bronzes at the European Championships.

Polaczyk finished 4th in the K1 event at the 2012 Summer Olympics in London.

He has four brothers (Grzegorz, Rafał, Henryk and Łukasz) and two sisters (Joanna Mędoń and Iwona) all of whom have competed in canoe slalom.

World Cup individual podiums

References

External links

Living people
Polish male canoeists
1988 births
Canoeists at the 2012 Summer Olympics
Olympic canoeists of Poland
People from Limanowa
Sportspeople from Lesser Poland Voivodeship
Medalists at the ICF Canoe Slalom World Championships